Lucban State University (LucSU), formerly known as Southern Luzon Polytechnic College (SLPC), is the premier, state-funded higher education institution in Quezon Province in the Philippines operating by virtue of Republic Act 9395. It is composed of 11 campuses in the province of Quezon, with the main campus situated in the Municipality of Lucban.
 
SLSU is mandated to provide advanced education, professional, technological instruction in the fields of allied medicine, education, engineering, agriculture, fisheries, forestry, environment, arts and sciences, accountancy, cooperative, business and entrepreneurship, technology and other relevant fields of study in the Province of Quezon and in Region IV-A CALABARZON. It is also mandated to undertake research and extension services and provide progressive leadership in its areas of specialization. By virtue of Republic Act 10931 or the Universal Access to Quality Tertiary Education Act signed by President Rodrigo Duterte, SLSU will no longer be collecting tuition fees from its local, first degree undergraduate students.

History 
Southern Luzon State University (SLSU) started as Lucban Municipal Junior High School by virtue of Municipal Resolution No. 5 passed in April 1964. Through the initiative of its founding president, Dr. Angelo Peña, a letter signed by 257 petitioners seeking the establishment of a Municipal Junior High School was favorably received and recommended by the Municipal Council and then Mayor Hobart Dator. The permit to operate was bestowed by Assistant Secretary of Education, Hon. Miguel Gaffud in July 1964. Since then, the Municipal Council allocated funds for its operations. Due to its expanding student population, Municipal Resolution No. 18 series of 1966 effectively expropriated about 4.9 ha of land in Barrio Kulapi - a site which the Council initially allocated for the establishment of a public market - in favor of the Municipal High School. This would then become the present site of the main campus of the university.

In May 1965, Municipal Resolution No. 86 was passed requesting the change of name to Lucban Municipal High School to accommodate students into the third and fourth year levels. The Director of Public Schools at the time approved the resolution in August 1965. On June 14, 1968, the Lucban Community College was created and was made part of Lucban Municipal Junior School as an adjunct institution for its School of Education, despite resistance from then Municipal and Provincial Councils for the school to operate as a college. The Municipal and Provincial Councils deemed it to be outside their authority to enact a law that would ensure the continued operation of the Community College.

The Lucban School for Philippine Craftsmen formally started in July 1970. By virtue of Republic Act 4345 also known as the merger law, the Lucban Municipal High School and Lucban School of Philippine Craftsmen became the Lucban National High School in July 1972 (with the continuous operation of Lucban Community College).

On August 30, 1977, President Ferdinand Marcos approved the conversion of the Lucban National High School and Lucban Community College into Lucban National College (LNC). This was in line with his administration's approach to countryside development by bringing Colleges and Universities to the provinces and rural areas. At the time, the LNC was the only government-run and funded College in the Southern Tagalog region.

In 1981, 20 Assemblymen of the Southern Tagalog Region sponsored the Parliamentary Bill No. 173 for the conversion of Lucban National College into Southern Luzon Polytechnic College (SLPC). The bill was approved in December 1981 and was signed into law known as Batas Pambansa No. 145 by President Marcos.

Since then, SLPC grew to establish seven satellite campuses located in various parts of the province of Quezon. The first satellite campus was inaugurated in Alabat in July 1991. In 1991, SLPC-Polilio was created by virtue of Board Resolution No. 19, Series of 1992. In the following year, two additional campuses were established: SLPC-Sampaloc in Brgy. Caldong, Sampaloc, Quezon (BOT Res. No. 33, series of 1993) and SLPC-Infanta. In 1996, another campus, the SLPC-Lucena Dual Training and Livelihood Center, was established under Board Resolution No. 130, series of 1996. Judge Guillermo Eleazar Polytechnic College was integrated in February 2002 under Board Resolution No. 352, series of 2002.

Judge Guillermo Eleazar Polytechnic College
Judge Guillermo Eleazar Polytechnic College was the former name of the college's satellite campus in Tagkawayan, Quezon. The satellite started as the Tagkawayan School of Fisheries under the Commission on Fisheries by virtue of Republic Act No. 4290 passed by the legislature on June 19, 1965. After 12 years, the school name was changed to Judge Guillermo Eleazar Memorial School of Fisheries by Presidential Decree No. 1273 issued by then president Ferdinand E. Marcos on December 27, 1977. Eventually, with the passage of Republic Act No. 8728, the school was converted into a state college known as Judge Guillermo Eleazar Polytechnic College. On March 17, 2007, through Republic Act No. 9395, it became part of the Southern Luzon State University.

Awards and Recognitions 

SLSU is the Commission on Higher Education (CHED) Center of Development in Teacher Education and Forestry. It is also an accredited "Dark Green School", which means that SLSU's instruction, research, and extension activities are geared towards environmental awareness and protection.

In 2018, the university is assessed as a Level III State University by the CHED, a level higher than in the 2007 evaluation. Based on the CHED-Department of Budget and Management Joint Circular, a Level III SUC is "very good in undertaking the functions of a state university/college", that is, instruction, research, and extension. In 2018, the AACCUP recognized SLSU as a top ranking SUC in the Philippines in terms of number of degree programs accredited.

The university has also been recognized by the Professional Regulation Commission (PRC) of the Philippines for top performance in licensure examinations and for producing topnotchers in board examinations in the fields of Nursing, Midwifery, Teacher Education, Forestry, Electrical Engineering, Electronics Technician, Mechanical Engineering, and Accountancy. In fact, in 2015, FindUniversity.PH ranks SLSU as the 17th best performing University in the Philippines, and the 2nd best performing State University in Region IV-A CALABARZON among Philippine Universities with at least 15 PRC Board Examinations.

Quality Assurance 
As a State University, SLSU is mandated to submit its programs and services to external audit for quality assurance. In terms of instruction, research, and extension services, periodic survey visits are conducted by the Accrediting Agency for Chartered Colleges and Universities in the Philippines (AACCUP). In terms of its management, it has been evaluated and granted the ISO 9001-2015 Certification for Quality Management System. The university is the first State University in the Southern Tagalog region to be ISO certified for Quality Management System in 2015. The Commission on Higher Education of the Philippines, on the other hand, conducts its in-house Institutional Sustainability Assessment (ISA).

As of May, 2017, 97% of all curricular programs both from the undergraduate and graduate levels in the main campus have been accredited by the Accrediting Agency of Chartered Colleges and Universities in the Philippines (AACCUP). Curricular programs in its satellite campuses in Tagkawayan and Tiaong have likewise been subjected to accreditation visits.

Colleges, Campuses and degree programs 
The Lucban main campus is home to five colleges: (1) Allied Medicine, (2) Teacher Education, (3) Arts and Sciences, (4) Administration, Business, Hospitality Management, and Accountancy, (5) Engineering and (6) Agriculture; one institute, the Institute of Human Kinetics, and various research centers for agricultural and environmental research. Starting A.Y. 2020–2021, the College of Industrial Technology will return to operations offering BS in Industrial Technology programs.

SLSU has satellite campuses in: Lucena, Tagkawayan, Alabat, Polillo, Tiaong, and Infanta. New satellite campuses have been/ will be opened in Gumaca, Catanauan, Tayabas, and Calauag.

The university also has key partner educational institutions in the Socialist Republic of Vietnam, Malaysia, and the United States. The partnerships allow educational exchange opportunities among the students and faculty of both parties. The university, together with the International School of Thai Nguyen University in Vietnam offers Joint academic programs in Business Administration, Environmental Science, and English language teaching. 

The following lists the academic programs offered by the university in the different colleges in the Lucban main campus and satellite campuses:

Graduate school

Administered by the College of Teacher Education
 PhD Development Education
 PhD Science Education
 PhD Educational Management
 Master of Arts in Educational Management
 Master of Arts in Education (Elementary)
 Master of Arts in Mathematics Education
 Master of Arts in Science Education
 Master of Arts in Teaching English (MATE)

Administered by the College of Arts and Sciences
 Master of Arts in Applied Linguistics
 Master of Arts in Psychology (Clinical Psychology)

Administered by the College of Administration, Business, Hospitality Management and Accountancy
 Doctor in Business Administration
 Master in Business Administration

Administered by the College of Agriculture
 MS Environmental Science
 Master of Science in Forestry (Major in Silviculture & AgroForestry)

Administered by the College of Allied Medicine
 Master of Arts in Nursing (Medical-Surgical Nursing, or Psychiatric Nursing)

International programs

Doctoral programs
 Doctor in Business Administration
 Ph.D. in Educational Management

Master's programs
 Master in Business Administration
 Master of Arts in Teaching English
 Master of Arts in Educational Management
 Master of Science in Environmental Science

Undergraduate programs
 Bachelor of Science in Business Administration major in Financial Management
 Bachelor of Science in Environmental Science

Short courses
 Intensive English Training Program (customized)
 Clinical Enhancement for Nurses Training
 Intensive English Training and Methodology for Teachers

College of Agriculture
(CHED Center of Development in Forestry)

 Bachelor of Science in Agriculture  Major in: Animal Science, Crop Science, Organic Agriculture
 Bachelor of Science in Forestry
 Bachelor of Science in Environmental Science
 Bachelor of Agricultural Technology

College of Administration, Business, Hospitality, and Accountancy

 Bachelor of Science in Accountancy
 Bachelor of Science in Business Administration  Major in: Marketing Management, Human Resource & Development Management, Financial Management 
 Bachelor of Science in Hospitality Management
 Bachelor of Public Administration

College of Allied Medicine

 Bachelor of Science in Nursing
 Bachelor of Science in Radiologic Technology
 Midwifery

College of Engineering

 Bachelor of Science in Computer Engineering 
 Bachelor of Science in Electrical Engineering 
 Bachelor of Science in Mechanical Engineering
 Bachelor of Science in Civil Engineering
 Bachelor of Science in Electronics Engineering
 Bachelor of Science in Industrial Engineering

College of Arts and Sciences

 Bachelor of Arts in Communication
 Bachelor of Arts major in History
 Bachelor of Arts major in Psychology
 Bachelor of Science in Mathematics major in Statistics
 Bachelor of Science in Biology

College of Teacher Education
(CHED Center of Development in Teacher Education)

 Bachelor of Elementary Education
 Bachelor of Secondary Education   Major in:  English, Filipino, Mathematics, MAPEH (Music, Arts, Physical Ed., Health), Physical Science, Social Studies
 Bachelor of Culture and Arts Education
 Bachelor of Technology and Livelihood Education  Major in: Industrial Arts, Information and Communication Technology, Home Economics

 Institute of Human Kinetics
 Bachelor of Physical Education major in Sports and Wellness Management
 Bachelor of Science in Exercise and Sports Sciences

 Laboratory Schools
 Elementary School Grades 1-6
 Junior High School Grades 7-10
 Senior High School Grades 11-12 with majors in Humanities & Social Sciences (HUMSS), Accounting, Business & Management (ABM), Science, Technology, Engineering & Mathematics (STEM)

College of Industrial Technology
(to return to full operations starting A.Y. 2020–2021)

 Bachelor of Science in Industrial Technology

Alabat Campus
 Bachelor of Technical-Vocational Education major in Computer Programming

Calauag Campus
 Bachelor of Science in Agriculture

Catanauan Campus
 Bachelor of Elementary Education
 Bachelor of Science in Agriculture

Gumaca Campus
 Bachelor of Technical-Vocational Education major in Computer Programming
 Bachelor of Science in Business Administration
 Bachelor of Secondary Education

Infanta Campus
 Bachelor of Secondary Education major in Mathematics
 Bachelor of Science in Agriculture
 Basic Engineering

Judge Guillermo Eleazar Polytechnic College - Tagkawayan Campus
 Bachelor of Elementary Education
 Bachelor of Business Administration  Major in:  Marketing Management, Financial Management
 Bachelor of Secondary Education  Major in:  English, Mathematics, Science
 Bachelor of Technology and Livelihood Education major in Agri-Fisheries Arts

Lucena City Campus
 Bachelor of Technical-Vocational Education  Major in:  Computer Programming, Food & Service Management

Polillo Campus
 Bachelor of Elementary Education

Tayabas City Campus
 Bachelor of Science in Agriculture
 Bachelor of Science in Hospitality Management
 Bachelor of Technology and Livelihood Education major in Computer Programming

Tiaong Campus
 Bachelor of Elementary Education
 Bachelor of Science in Agriculture  Major in: Crop Science, Organic Agriculture

Facilities

References

Most of the Content were acquired from the SLSU Website and University Profile.

External links

 The Official Website of SLSU
 The Official Website of SLSU College of Arts and Sciences
 The Official Facebook Page of Southern Luzon State University
 The Official Facebook Page of SLSU Tiaong Campus

Universities and colleges in Quezon
State universities and colleges in the Philippines